The Intermediate League World Series (ILWS) Latin America Region and Puerto Rico Region are two of six international regions that currently send teams to the World Series in Livermore, California. The regions' participation in the ILWS dates back to 2013.

Latin America Region Countries

Region Champions
As of the 2022 Intermediate League World Series.

Prior to 2019, the champion of Puerto Rico received an automatic bid to the World Series. Beginning in 2019, the Mexico Region has an automatic berth in odd-numbered years; while the Puerto Rico Region has one in even-numbered years. For years without an automatic bid, they compete in the Latin America Region tournament.

Puerto Rico Region Champions

Mexico Region Champions

Latin America Region Champions

Results by Country
As of the 2022 Intermediate League World Series.

See also
Latin American regions in other Little League baseball divisions:
Little League:
Latin America
Mexico
Caribbean
Junior League:
Latin America
Mexico / Puerto Rico
Senior League:
Caribbean
Latin America
Big League

References

Intermediate League World Series
Latin America
Latin American baseball leagues